Mustapha Bidoudane (born 18 June 1976) is a Moroccan former football player.

External links
 

1976 births
Footballers from Rabat
Living people
Association football forwards
Moroccan footballers
Morocco international footballers
Fath Union Sport players
Al-Shabab FC (Riyadh) players
Raja CA players
FC Rostov players
Maghreb de Fès players
Club Africain players
Wydad AC players
AS FAR (football) players
Kawkab Marrakech players
Ittihad Khemisset players
Botola players
Saudi Professional League players
Russian Premier League players
Tunisian Ligue Professionnelle 1 players
2004 African Cup of Nations players
Moroccan expatriate footballers
Expatriate footballers in Saudi Arabia
Moroccan expatriate sportspeople in Saudi Arabia
Expatriate footballers in Russia
Moroccan expatriate sportspeople in Russia
Expatriate footballers in Tunisia
Moroccan expatriate sportspeople in Tunisia